Label Fandango is an independent record label based in Highbury, London. Evolving out of parent companies Fierce Panda Records and Pointy Records, it has been releasing limited edition music singles since 2005. It is run by live music promotion company Club Fandango.

Origin and format
In late 2005, Label Fandango Records, was set up in order to release music from new and up-and-coming bands based in the UK. It began through Andy Macleod and Simon Williams, of Pointy Records and Fierce Panda Records respectively, who together were the creators of London live music promotions company Club Fandango. Williams had previously released the debut singles by Coldplay and Keane.

The no-budget record company has a strictly DIY theme to it, with the tag line "No frills, All thrills". Inspired by other indie labels Transgressive, Marquis Cha Cha and Dance To The Radio, it specialises in limited edition seven-inch vinyls, released in a generic black and while sleeve branded with the "Label Fandango" logo. It complements its Fierce Panda parent, who recently ceased producing limited singles to focus on full-length releases. The records are designed to project bands on to further opportunities with more major record labels, examples being Royworld and Air Traffic (who have since signed to Virgin Records and Tiny Consumer of EMI respectively). The label has released 24 limited edition singles to date.

Recent activity
Fandango's most recent record, a double-A side of "Runaround Getaround / MOR" by Tim Ten Yen, is set for release on 6 October 2008. On the label's website, Label Fandango's promoters have stated that although they wish to continue releasing limited singles, they wish to move on to releasing full-length albums in the coming months.
In 2011 the label released the double A sided single from the Sheffield-based band Hey Sholay entitled Dreamboat/The Bears The Clock The Bees.

List of releases (2005 – present)
Each vinyl release has an accompanying digital download, which is accessed through the 7digital catalogue.

27 June 2011
"Dreamboat" / "The Bears The Clock The Bees"
Hey Sholay

See also
List of record labels
Club Fandango
Fierce Panda Records
Pointy Records

References

External links
Club Fandango Official Website
Label Fandango Home Page
Label Fandango at Last.fm

British record labels
Record labels established in 2006
Record labels based in London
Indie rock record labels
Alternative rock record labels